Niedźwiada may refer to the following places in Poland: 
Niedźwiada, Łódź Voivodeship (central Poland)
Niedźwiada, Lubartów County in Lublin Voivodeship (east Poland)
Niedźwiada, Subcarpathian Voivodeship (south-east Poland)
Niedźwiada, Warmian-Masurian Voivodeship (north Poland)